is an English trusts law case, concerning remedies for breach of trust for a conflict of interest. It exemplifies a restitution claim.

Facts
The Murad sisters and Mr Al-Saraj, who acted through his company called W Co, started a joint venture (which creates fiduciary duties among those in the venture) to buy a hotel at £4.1m, through a new company. The Murads would contribute £1m, and £500,000 was meant to come from Mr Al-Saraj. The rest was to come from a bank loan. But Al-Saraj instead set off an unenforceable debt that the seller of the property owed him, and also got a commission for arranging the sale. This was a breach of fiduciary duty, by fraudulently misrepresenting his contribution and failing to disclose his profit. The hotel was then sold at a profit of $2m.

Judgment

High Court
At first instance Etherton J held that even if the Murads had known, they would have gone ahead with the purchase, although they would have demanded a greater share of the profits. Nevertheless, Mr Al-Saraj and his company had to account for the entire profit made. Mr Al-Saraj argued that his liability should not be his full profits, but only those that he would not have made if the fraud and secret profit were not present.

Court of Appeal
The Court of Appeal held that a fiduciary had to give up his unauthorised gains. It was irrelevant what he might have done, and not within the ability of Mr Al-Saraj, given his wrongdoing, to argue that some better outcome may have transpired if he had been honest. A fiduciary may retain gains that are properly to be regarded as the product of his own skill and labour, rather than breach of duty. Only actual consent could get rid of the liability to account. Arden LJ said that because of the advances in evidence and civil procedure, there is no reason the courts are incapable of addressing what might have happened.

Jonathan Parker LJ concurred.

Clarke LJ dissented on the extent of Mr Al-Saraj’s liability to account. Where there was an antecedent arrangement for profit sharing, it could be shown that it is inequitable to account for all profits.

See also

English trusts law

Notes

References

English trusts case law
Court of Appeal (England and Wales) cases
2005 in case law
2005 in British law